Pustulatirus virginensis is a species of sea snail, a marine gastropod mollusk in the family Fasciolariidae, the spindle snails, the tulip snails and their allies.

References

External links
 Rosenberg, G.; Moretzsohn, F.; García, E. F. (2009). Gastropoda (Mollusca) of the Gulf of Mexico, Pp. 579–699 in: Felder, D.L. and D.K. Camp (eds.), Gulf of Mexico–Origins, Waters, and Biota. Texas A&M Press, College Station, Texas
 Lyons, W. G.; Snyder, M. A. (2013). The Genus Pustulatirus Vermeij and Snyder, 2006 (Gastropoda: Fasciolariidae: Peristerniinae) in the Western Atlantic, with Descriptions of Three New Species. Zootaxa. 3636(1): 35.

Fasciolariidae
Gastropods described in 1958